Ernelinde, princesse de Norvège (Ernelinde, Princess of Norway) is a three-act operatic tragédie lyrique, by the French composer François-André Danican Philidor. The libretto was by Antoine-Alexandre-Henri Poinsinet, after  opera libretto La fede tradita, e vendicata.

Performance history
The work was first performed on 24 November 1767 by the Paris Opera at the Salle des Machines in the Palais des Tuileries in Paris. The first version was given about eighteen times, with the final performance on 10 January 1768. Revised as Sandomir, prince de Dannemarck, it was given in the same theatre on 24 January 1769. This version was also performed in Brussels in 1772. The libretto was further revised in five acts by Michel-Jean Sedaine, this time as Ernelinde with fully orchestrated recitatives by Philidor, and given at the Théâtre Gabriel at the Palace of Versailles on 11 December 1773 and in Brussels in 1774. Philidor and Sedaine revised the five-act version for another set of performances given by the Paris Opera at the second Salle du Palais-Royal beginning on 8 July 1777. It was last revived in June 1778.

The 1777 performances, with their exotic Viking setting,  excited enough interest to provoke parodies. One by Jean-Étienne Despréaux, entitled Berlingue, was performed at the Théâtre Royal de la Cour at the Château de Choisy on 13 September, another anonymous work called Sans dormir was given by the Comédie Italienne at the Hôtel de Bourgogne on 12 October.

Roles

Synopsis
A Viking-era saga about the struggle for control of Norway, Sweden and Denmark – and for the hand of the Norwegian princess Ernelinde.

References
Notes

Sources
Rushton, Julian (1992), 'Ernelinde, princesse de Norvège' in The New Grove Dictionary of Opera, ed. Stanley Sadie (London) 
Rushton Julian (1994): Ernelinde : Tragédie Lyrique (1767). (French Opera in the 17th & 18th Centuries‚ No. 8) Pendragon Press,

External links
 
 1767 libretto (as Ernelinde, princesse de Norvege) at Gallica
 1769 libretto (as Sandomir, prince de Dannemarck) at Gallica

Operas by François-André Danican Philidor
Tragédies en musique
French-language operas
1767 operas
Operas